There are many companies operating trains in the United Kingdom, including the operators of franchised passenger services, officially referred to as train operating companies (TOCs), as distinct from freight operating companies.

Passenger operators in Great Britain 

There are also a number of light rail systems.

Defunct operating companies 
Operating companies have ceased to exist for various reasons, including withdrawal of the franchise, the term of the franchise has expired, bankruptcy or merger.

Passenger operators in Northern Ireland 
In Northern Ireland, passenger trains are NI/Ireland government-owned by Translink or the National Transport Authority. The following brands are used:

Northern Ireland Railways
Iarnród Éireann, who operates the Enterprise service from Dublin Connolly to Belfast Lanyon Place on the Belfast-Dublin line with Northern Ireland Railways and also 2 Northern Commuter services a day to/from Newry.

UK Railtour operators 

Compass Tours
DPS Railtours
Pathfinder Tours
Scottish Railway Preservation Society
Venice-Simplon Orient Express (British Pullman and Northern Belle services)
Vintage Trains
West Coast Railways
Locomotive Services Limited

Luxury railtours
Belmond Grand Hibernian (From August 2016)
Steam Dreams (Emerald Isle Explorer)

In Northern Ireland
Enthusiast railtours
Railway Preservation Society of Ireland
Irish Railway Record Society
The Modern Railway Society of Ireland

Freight operators 
Colas Rail
DCRail
Direct Rail Services
DB Cargo UK (formerly English Welsh & Scottish Railway)
Freightliner
GB Railfreight
Mendip Rail

Franchised passenger operator structure in Great Britain

See also
Passenger rail franchising in Great Britain (for detailed information about the history of each franchise)

References

External links
List of Train Operating Companies on the National Rail website
Map of Train Operating Companies on the National Rail website
Barry Doe's colour-coded map showing operator(s) on each route (Large PDF)

Companies operating trains in the United Kingdom
United Kingdom